Nibea soldado, commonly known as the soldier croaker, is a species of fish native to the northern Indian and western Pacific Oceans, and found in estuaries of south and southeast Asia, Indochina and northern Australia.

References

Sciaenidae
Fish of Southeast Asia
Marine fish of Northern Australia
Fish of Indonesia
Fish of India
Fish of the Indian Ocean
Fish described in 1802